Dagne is a given name and surname. Notable people with it include:

Given name
 Dagne Alemu (born 1980), Ethiopian-long-distance runner
 Dagnė Čiukšytė (born 1977), Lithuanian chess player
Dagné Y. Alvarez (1995), Panamenian lawyer

Surname
 Birhan Dagne (born 1978), Ethiopian-born British long-distance runner